The Metropolitan Waterworks and Sewerage System, formerly known as the National Waterworks and Sewerage System Authority (NAWASA), is the government agency that is in charge of water privatization in Metro Manila in the Philippines. It split the water concession into an east and a west concession with Manila Water being awarded one contract and Maynilad Water Services being awarded the other.

History

The first water system in the Philippines was initiated by the Spanish Philanthropist, Francisco Carriedo y Peredo (November 7, 1690 – September 1743). Carriedo donated funds to be used in Manila; however, it was never realized until a century later, when the Spanish Franciscan friar Felix Huerta, tracked down the funds donated by Carriedo, and instigated the development of the Carriedo Water System. The construction of the water system delivered 16 million liters of water per day to 300,000 people. By 1909, the capacity of the system was increased to 92 million liters per day by the addition of pumping facilities and the construction of Wawa Dam.

With its expansion of responsibilities, the institution changed its name several times from the Carriedo Water System, to the Manila Water Supply System in 1908, to the Metropolitan Water District in 1919, to the National Waterworks and Sewerage System Authority (Pangasiwaan ng Pambansang Tubig at Alkantarilya), and finally, to the Metropolitan Waterworks and Sewerage System (MWSS) in 1971.

Former Directors

1930–1934: Paul W. Mack 
1934–1938: Gregorio Anonas 
1938–1947: Ambrosio Magsaysay 
1947–1955: Manuel Mañosa 
1955–1963: Susano R. Nagado 
1963–1966: Jesus C. Perlas 
1966–1969: Antonio C. Menor 
1969–1976: Sergio M. Isada
1976–1983: Oscar J. Ilustre 
1983–1986: Abor P. Canlas 
1986–1987: Jose Yap 
1987–1992: Luis V. Sison 
1992–1994: Teofilo J. Asuncion 
1994–1995 Ruben A. Hernandez 
1995–1997: Dr. Angel L. Lazaro III 
1997–2000: Dr. Reynaldo B. Vea 
2000–2001: Jose F. Mabanta 
2001–2006: Orlando C. Hondrade 
2007–2008: Lorenzo H. Jamora 
2008–2010: Diosdado Jose M. Allado

Metropolitan Waterworks and Sewerage System Regulatory Office

The MWSS Regulatory Office (RO) was created in August 1997 by virtue of the Concession Agreements signed between the MWSS and the two concessionaires, Manila Water Company, Inc. for the East Zone and Maynilad Water Services, Inc. for the West Zone.

RO functions as a collegial body composed of five members headed by the Director or Chief Regulator who has over-all responsibility for the operation of the office. Other members are the Regulators for Technical Regulation, Customer Service Regulation, Financial Regulation and Administration and Legal Affairs.

Any action or decision by the RO on substantive matters affecting the Concession Agreement requires at least a majority vote of three members. The Chief Regulator chairs the meeting of the Regulatory Office and has the final approval over the hiring and dismissal of all professional staff of the RO. He also acts as the principal spokesperson of the office.

RO is mandated to monitor the Concession Agreement. Among its many functions, RO reviews, monitor and enforces rates and service standards; arranges and reports regular independent audits of the performance of the Concessionaires; and monitors the infrastructure assets. However, RO’s functions may change over time for effective regulation of water and sewerage services.

Private Concessionaires

Maynilad
Manila Water

References

External links
MWSS Official Website
MWSS-RO Official Website

1971 establishments in the Philippines
Water supply and sanitation in Metro Manila
Government-owned and controlled corporations of the Philippines
Government in Metro Manila